Swiss Cottage was a ward in the London Borough of Camden, in the United Kingdom. The ward was first created for the 1971 election, redrawn in 1978 and 2002, and abolished for the 2022 elections. The population of this ward at the 2011 Census was 12,900.

Swiss Cottage ward was a long, thin ward centred on the intersection between Avenue Road and Finchley Road at Swiss Cottage. To the west of the intersection, it included South Hampstead. To the south-east, it included the northern part of St John's Wood and western part of Primrose Hill.

Under its previous form, Swiss Cottage covered just South Hampstead, while the former Adelaide ward covered the parts of the ward the east of Finchley Road (including Ye Olde Swiss Cottage itself). The ward was abolished for the 2022 election and its area was divided between the newly created Primrose Hill and South Hampstead wards.

Councillors
Notable former councillors include Andrew Marshall (former Leader of the Conservative Group on Camden Council), Gloria Lazenby (former Labour Mayor of Camden), Tony Kerpel (political adviser who served as the personal assistant to Prime Minister Edward Heath), and former Labour cabinet minister Tessa Jowell. In 2002, Swiss Cottage elected Camden's first Jamaican councillor, Don Williams.

1978–2022
Three councillors represented Swiss Cottage ward between 1978 and 2022.

1971–1978
Four councillors represented Swiss Cottage ward between 1971 and 1978.

Election results
The last election was held on 3 May 2018. Candidates seeking re-election are marked with an asterisk (*).

2002–2018

2018 election

2014 election

In 2018, Andrew Marshall resigned from the Conservative Party and defected to the Liberal Democrats.

2010 election

2006 election

2002 election

1978–2002
The last election on 7 May 1998 was held under the original ward boundaries.

1999 by-election

The by-election was called following the resignation of Mary Ryan.

1998 election

1994 election

1992 by-election

The by-election was called following the resignation of Vaughan A. Emsley.

1990 election

1986 election

1983 by-election

The by-election was called following the resignation of Derek Spencer on his election as MP for Leicester South.

1982 election

1979 by-election

The by-election was called following the resignation of Brian Stoner.

1978 election

Pre 1978
Before 1978, under different boundaries, the ward was represented by four councillors.

1977 by-election
 

The by-election was called following the resignation of Ronald Raymond-Cox.

1974 election

1972 by-election
 

The by-election was called following the resignation of John Eidinow.

1971 election

References

Former wards of the London Borough of Camden
1978 establishments in England
2022 disestablishments in England
Swiss Cottage